The following is a list of the MTV Europe Music Award winners and nominees for Best Israeli Act.

Winners and nominees
Winners are listed first and highlighted in bold.

1990s

2000s

2010s

2020s

Local Hero Award

References

MTV Europe Music Awards
Israeli music awards
Awards established in 2008